Hungary competed at the 2022 World Aquatics Championships in Budapest, Hungary from 18 June to 3 July.

Athletes by discipline
The following is the list of number of competitors participating at the Championships per discipline.

1 male athlete will compete in both open water swimming and in indoor swimming, and included within the swimming numbers.

Medalists

Artistic swimming

Women

Diving

Women

Open water swimming

Men

Women

Mixed

Swimming

Men

Women

Water polo

Summary

Men's tournament

Team roster

Group play

Quarterfinal

5–8th place semifinals

Seventh place game

Women's tournament

Team roster

Group A

Playoffs

Quarterfinals

Semifinals

Final

References

World Aquatics Championships
2022
Nations at the 2022  World Aquatics Championships